Amblers, also known as the Coke-Watts House, is a historic farmstead at 2205 Jamestown Road in James City County, Virginia, just north of the Jamestown peninsula.  Its main house is a handsome -story brick structure, built in 1852 in the country style promoted by Andrew Jackson Downing, and expanded with a sympathetically styled Colonial Revival addition in the 1950s.  The property includes two surviving 19th-century brick farm outbuildings, and landscaping from the 1950s that is also considered historically significant.

The property was listed on the National Register of Historic Places in 2015.

See also
National Register of Historic Places listings in James City County, Virginia

References

Houses on the National Register of Historic Places in Virginia
Houses completed in 1852
Houses in James City County, Virginia
National Register of Historic Places in James City County, Virginia
1852 establishments in Virginia